Grunsky is a Russian surname. Notable people with the surname include:

Carl E. Grunsky (1855–1934), American geologist and civil engineer
Donald L. Grunsky (1915-2000), American politician
Eric Grunsky, Canadian scientist
Helmut Grunsky (1904–1986), German mathematician
Jack Grunsky (born 1945), Canadian singer-songwriter
Matthias Grunsky (born 1971), Austrian cinematographer